Darantasiella is a genus of moths in the subfamily Arctiinae. It contains the single species Darantasiella javanica, which is found on Java.

References

Natural History Museum Lepidoptera generic names catalog

Lithosiini